"Shirt" is a song by American singer-songwriter SZA and the third single from her second studio album, SOS (2022). It was released through Top Dawg Entertainment and RCA Records on October 28, 2022, and teased two years beforehand; its previewed snippets spawned a viral dance challenge on TikTok, a video-sharing application. Originally untitled, the song was given two names by fans: the official title and the alternative "Bloodstain". "Shirt" is a song that combines R&B with elements of trap music, incorporating glitchy hi-hat drums and Roland TR-808 beats. In the lyrics, SZA sings of a former toxic relationship to which she is enticed to return.

SZA wrote the R&B song with producers Darkchild and Freaky Rob. It reached the top 20 in Australia, Canada, Ireland, New Zealand, the United Kingdom, and the United States.

Background
SZA released her debut studio album, Ctrl, in 2017. Primarily an R&B album that deals with themes like heartbreak, it received widespread acclaim for its vocals and eclectic musical style, as well as the emotional impact and confessional nature of its songwriting. The album brought SZA to mainstream fame, and critics credit it with establishing her status as a major figure in contemporary pop and R&B music and pushing the boundaries of the R&B genre. Her next studio album was therefore highly anticipated, and she alluded to its completion as early as August 2019 during an interview with DJ Kerwin Frost. In 2020, she released "Hit Different" in September and "Good Days" in December, marking her first solo singles since Ctrl.

Between the releases, on October 7, SZA posted a brief preview of an untitled song to her Instagram Story. By December, the snippet spawned a viral dance challenge on video sharing application TikTok, and within two months it appeared in over 1.3 million videos; SZA herself participated in the trend. The teased song did not have a title, so fans started calling it by two names: "Bloodstain" and "Shirt". In March 2021, the music video for "Good Days" premiered on YouTube. An extended snippet of the unreleased song, lasting for one minute, appears at the end, similar to how "Good Days" was teased at the outro of the one for "Hit Different". In the preview, SZA pole dances in the middle of a gas station.

SZA confirmed plans to begin working on her next album in January 2020. In an interview with Rolling Stone, SZA mentioned that "Music is coming out for sure", but stated that it may not result in an album, as of yet. She also said that the rumor that she was planning to release a trilogy of albums and then retire from music, "is nonsense". She informed her fans about the state of the song on January 28, 2021, saying that finishing it became her "only priority". When SZA collaborated with Cosmopolitan for their February 2021 issue, she talked about the emotions she expected to feel while making the album. She told the magazine, "this album is going to be the shit that made me feel something in my...here and in here", pointing to her heart and gut.

Music and lyrics 
Spin described "Shirt" as a slow-burning "electro-R&B" song, or a song that combines R&B with electronic music. Around 3 minutes long, it was written by SZA and its producers Darkchild and Freaky Rob. Containing influences of trap music, the song is backed by Roland TR-808 beats, glitchy hi-hat drums, and a prominent sub bass.

Release 
Following the fans' whims, SZA made "Shirt" the song's official title. During a performance at Wireless UK on July 9, 2022, SZA revealed that American rapper and singer Doja Cat is set to be featured on a remix of the song. When performing at Austin City Limits on October 16, she confirmed rumors that the song was supposed to come out on October 14. The release was postponed due to SZA's discontent with the video. On October 21, the song was mistakenly put on streaming services and removed instantly. The song and its music video was officially announced on October 26, and both were released two days later. A lyric video of the song made by FahMeedX (who also created the official lyric videos for "Good Days" and "I Hate U") was also released days later on November 1.

During a Billboard cover story published in November, SZA revealed the album title, SOS, as well as the release date which was scheduled sometime next month. On December 5, 2022, she posted the track list on Twitter, and SOS was released four days later. Out of 23 songs, "Shirt" appears as the nineteenth track. Originally, it was not planned to be included on the album, but when she saw fans' enthusiastic response to the song, she and her label's executives changed her mind. Speaking to People, she said: "It's always interesting to see what people gravitate toward and what they don't [...] Sometimes what I like doesn't line up with other people and that is tricky, always tricky."

Critical reception 
Some critics considered "Shirt" a highlight of SOS. Former US president Barack Obama included "Shirt" in his playlist of favorite songs of 2022. Additionally, year-end lists from several publications have ranked it among the best 2022 songs. In January 2023, American Songwriter named "Shirt" as the sixth best song in SZA's discography.

Music video
On October 14, SZA stated that she had just turned the video in after changing "one small thing". She posted a preview on her social media on October 26. SZA is seen chatting with a man, played by LaKeith Stanfield. The music video, directed by Dave Meyers was released on October 28. As with her previous singles, the ending features a snippet of another upcoming song. She revealed the song to be called "Blind" on her social media.

Live performances 
On July 2, 2021, SZA collaborated with vodka company Grey Goose Essences for the "In Bloom" concert, in promotion of their newest line of vodka. The concert contained a snippet of "Shirt", marking its first live performance.

Charts

Certifications

Release history

Notes

References

2022 singles
2022 songs
RCA Records singles
Songs written by SZA
Song recordings produced by Rodney Jerkins
SZA songs
Top Dawg Entertainment singles